Totemball is an Xbox Live Arcade musical action game developed by Freeverse Software/Strange Flavour and published by Microsoft Game Studios. It takes advantage of the Xbox Live Vision Camera with the camera tracking the players hand movements. It was released on October 4, 2006 as a free download. It does require the camera to play.

Compatibility
Unlike other Xbox Live Vision titles, Totemball is not compatible with the Kinect and can only be played with the original Xbox Live Vision camera, because it was released before the Kinect existed.

TotemBall received "mixed or poor" reviews from critics according to Metacritic with a current score of 44/100.

See also
Xbox Live Arcade
Xbox Live Vision

References

2006 video games
Freeverse Inc. games
Freeware games
Microsoft games
Music video games
Xbox 360 Live Arcade games
Xbox 360-only games
Video games developed in the United Kingdom
Xbox 360 games
Multiplayer and single-player video games
Strange Flavour games